Rodrigo Alberto Raín Vejar (born 13 April 1975) is a former Chilean footballer who played as centre back.

His last club was Unión La Calera.

Personal life
Raín is of Mapuche descent.

References

External links
 
 

1975 births
Living people
Chilean people of Mapuche descent
Sportspeople from Concepción, Chile
Chilean footballers
C.D. Huachipato footballers
Universidad de Concepción footballers
Everton de Viña del Mar footballers
Cobreloa footballers
Coquimbo Unido footballers
Ñublense footballers
Lota Schwager footballers
Unión La Calera footballers
Primera B de Chile players
Chilean Primera División players
Association football defenders
Mapuche sportspeople
Indigenous sportspeople of the Americas